Somonino railway station is a railway station serving the town of Somonino, in the Pomeranian Voivodeship, Poland. The station is located on the Nowa Wieś Wielka–Gdynia Port railway and Somonino–Kartuzy railway. The train services are operated by SKM Tricity.

Modernisation
In 2014 the platform was modernised.

Train services
The station is served by the following services:
Pomorska Kolej Metropolitalna services (R) Kościerzyna — Gdańsk Port Lotniczy (Airport) — Gdańsk Wrzeszcz — Gdynia Główna
Pomorska Kolej Metropolitalna services (R) Kościerzyna — Gdańsk Osowa — Gdynia Główna

References

Somonino article at Polish Stations Database, URL accessed at 6 March 2006
 This article is based upon a translation of the Polish language version as of July 2016.

Railway stations in Pomeranian Voivodeship
Kartuzy County